The New Jersey Inventor's Hall of Fame was established in 1987 to honor individuals and corporations in New Jersey for their inventions. Award recipients are recognized at the annual Award Banquet Dinner.  The New Jersey Inventors Hall of Fame operated from 1987 to 2002 at the New Jersey Institute of Technology, from 2003 to 2007 with support from the Research and Development Council of New Jersey. Starting in 2008 it was under the aegis of Stevens Institute of Technology Office of Academic Entrepreneurship.  In 2010, Greenberg Traurig became a co-sponsor of the organization.

Hall of Fame Inductees

Other Hall of Fame Inductees

 1989
 Calvin MacCracken
 Roy Weber
 1990
 Hubert Lechevalier
 Arthur Patchett 
 William Pfefferle
 Harold Seidel 
 Marvin Weinstein 
 1991
 Benjamin Abeles, George Cody 
 Carlyle Caldwell
 Gordon W. Calundann 
 Andrew G. F. Dingwall 
 C. Reed Funk 
 Anthony D. Kurtz
 Jerome Murray
 1992
 Melvin L. Druin
 Frederick J. Karol
 Harold Law 
 William L. Maxson
 1993
 Marc A. Chavannes, Alfred W. Fielding
 Erwin Klingsberg
 Keith D. Millis
 1994
 Jack Avins
 William O. Geyer
 George R. Hansen
 Phillip H. Smith
 Richard Williams (inventor)
 1995
 David Aronson (inventor)
 Alvin M. Cohan
 George deStevens
 Joseph J. Mascuch
 Glenn Leslie Dimmick
 Kenneth S. Johnson
 1996
 Richard Dehmel (inventor)
 Arnold J. Morway
 Charles Frederick Wallace
 N. Joseph Woodland
 1997 
 Ezra Gould
 Milton Morse
 Harry L. Yale
 1998 
 Joseph Abys
 Nikil S. Jayant
 Henry M. Rowan
 1999
 Cyrus W. Bemmels
 Haig Kafafian
 Morton A. Kreitchman
 2000 
 Albert Ballman, Robert Laudise, Bell Laboratories/Lucent Technologies of Murray Hill, NJ 
 Alan White (inventor)
 2001 
 Homer Z. Martin
 Charles W. Tyson
 Abdul Gaffar
 Glen A. Reitmeier
 2002 
 Isaac S. Blonder
 Ben H. Tongue
 Anthony E. Winston
 2004 
 Dr. Corrado Dragone
 Mr. Walter J. Krupick
 Colonel Willian Blair
 Dr. Meredith C. Gourdine
 2005 
 William Trager
 Howard J. Ellison
 Clarence D. Chang, Anthony J. Silvestri, William H. Lang
 2006
 Daryl M. Chapin, Gerald L. Pearson
 2009 
 Yvonne Claeys Brill 
 2010 
 Dr. Michael Tompsett
 Dr. Andrew Chraplyvy
 Dr. Robert Tkach
 Dr. Kenneth Walker (inventor)

Inventors of the Year 

Other Inventors of the Year 

 1989
 Frank Gutleber
 Sheldon Karesh, Dusan Prevorsek
 Leo Harwood
 Amos Joel, Jr.
 Glenn Johnson, Jr. 
 Walter Kosonocky 
 Mandayam Narasimhan 
 Deger Tunc
 1990
 Michael Catapano, Renato Noe
 Daniel Kramer (inventor)
 Juris Mednis
 Franklin Reick
 Bart Zoltan
 1991
 William Charney
 Charles Covino
 Jack R. Hartford
 Frederick M. Kahan
 Gregory H. Olsten
 Joseph F. Rizzo
 David Savage, Guido Sartori & Winston S. Ho
 Stanley S. Schodowski
 Joseph V. Milo
 1992
 Murrae Bowden, Larry F. Thompson
 John D. Geberth, Jr.
 Gideon Goldstein
 August F. Manz
 Victor Palinczar
 Ross C. Terrell
 1993
 Michael J. Flowers
 Louis L. Grube
 Sue Wilson
 1994
 Eric J. Addeo
 Robert E. Kerwin, Donald L. Klein, John C. Sarace
 Kuo-Yann Lai
 June D. Passaretti
 Milan R. Uskokovic
 Gilbert Zweig
 1995
 Richard Frenkiel
 Robert D. Howson
 Carl H. X
 Liang Tai Wu
 1996
 Leslie R. Avery
 Gilbert Buchalter
 Lanny S. Smoot
 Dominik M. Wiktor
 1997
 Arthur L. Babson
 Walter Jinotti
 Steven M. Kuznicki
 Lee-Fang Wei
 Tsong-Ho Wu, Richard C.L. Lau
 1998
 Gary Ver Strate Mark J. Struglinski of Exxon Chemical Company in Linden, John E. Johnston of Warren Exxon Research and Engineering Co. in Annandale, Roger K. West
 Joseph Dettling of Howell - Zhicheng Hu, Y.K. Lui, C.Z. Wan, Engelhard Industries
 Michael Pappas (inventor)
 Melvin E. Kamen
 John Mickowski
 1999
 Andrew Chraplyvy, Matawan Robert Tkach, Kenneth Walker (inventor)
 William Hickerson
 2000
 Gerard P. Canevari, Robert J. Fiocco, Richard R. Lessard
 Alfonso DiMino
 Barin Haskell
 2001
 J. Thomas Jennings
 James D. Johnston (inventor)
 Jack H. Winters
 2002
 Valerie A. Bell
 Irwin Gerszberg
 Antoni S. Gozdz, Jean-Marie Tarascon, Paul C. Warren
 2004
 Dr. Igor Palley
 2005
 David M. Goldenberg
 Jack R. Harford
 Harry T. Roman
 2006
 Claude E. Gagna
 2008
 Amit Limaye
 2009
 Michael Seul
 Christos Christodoulatos, George P. Korfiatis, Xiaoguang Meng, Mazakhir Dadachov
 2010
 Dr. Nicolas Girard (inventor)
 Dr. Bijan Harichian
 Richard Caizza

Innovator Award

Corporate Award

Trustees Award
Representative Rush Holt (2009)
Dr. Ralph Izzo (2010)
Dr. Jeong Kim (2011)
Dr. Stephen Chu (2012)
Shirley Ann Jackson, Ph.D. (2013)
Greg Olsen, Ph.D. (2014)

Outstanding Contributions Award
Dr. Gertrude M. Clarke (2011)
 Inventor Harry Roman (2012)
 (2013)
 (2014)

Graduate Student Award
 2005
 Yuanqiu Luo
 Shuangquan Wang
 2006
 Sudhakar Shet
 Dimitrios Zarkadas
 2008
 Zhiqiang Gao
 Amey Shevtekar
 Hong Zhang
 2009
 Chuan-Bi Lin
 Ziqian Cecilia Dong
 Dipshikha Biswas
 2010
 Ms. Jingjing Zhang
 Dr. Xiaoling Chen
 Dr. Asli Ergun
 2011
 Milan Begliarbekov
 Komlan Egoh
 Andrew Ihnen
 Eric Stroud
 2012
 Xiaoling Fu
 Linh Le
 Seyed Babak Mahjour
 Ishan Wathuthanthri
 Jie Yang
 Yan Zhang
 2013
 Xuening Chen, Ph.D.
 Chun-Hao Lo, Ph.D. 
 Khondaker Salehin, Ph.D.
 Wenting Zhang
2014
Hui Chen
Yexin Gu
Tao Han

Special Award
 1993
 Bonnie L. James, Cherica Inc., Tuckerton
 Italo Marchiony (1868-1954), Hoboken
 1994
 Donald J. Sauer
 James T. Reynolds
 John J. Frins
 James Edward Johnstone
 1995
 Allan H. Willinger
 Michael D. Mintz
 William J. von Liebig
 1996
 Barbara Derkoski
 Otto Niederer
 1997
 Martin C. Pettesch
 1998
 William Lowell of Maplewood, New Jersey for the golf tee
 Quentin T. Kelly, Pennington and WorldWater Corp., Pennington
 Melvin Levinson
 1999
 Lisa Gable
 William Greeley
 2000
 Stephan Schaffan, Jr.
 2001
 David Brown (inventor)
 Wellington Titus 
 Fred Topinka
 2002
 Dave Hammond
 2004
 Dr. Phillip J. Petillo
 Dr. Majid Abou-Gharbia
 2009
 Michael J. Flowers
 2010
 Dr. Timothy Chang (inventor)
 2012
 Ken Zorovich & Yos Kumthampinij & John C. Earle
 2013
 Barry H. Katz, M.D.
 2014
 Ronnie Z. Bochner, M.D.

Advancement of Invention Award
New Jersey Institute of Technology in Newark, New Jersey (1997)
New Jersey Commission on Science and Technology (1999)
Gil Zweig (2009)
Dr. Dr. Rainer Martini (2011)
Dr. Dr. Hsuan Lillian Labowsky (2012)
Dr. Yu-Dong Yao, Ph.D. (2013)
Dr. Beatrice Hicks, D.Sc. (Hon) (2013)
Dr. Leslie Brunell, P.E., Ph.D (2014)
Dr. Beth McGrath, Mercedes McKay & Jason Sayres (2014)
Dr. Joshua Weston (2014)

See also
National Inventors Hall of Fame
Aviation Hall of Fame and Museum of New Jersey
Edison Patent Award

References

External links
Official website
 Research and Development Council of New Jersey

 
Halls of fame in New Jersey
State halls of fame in the United States
Science and technology halls of fame
Biographical museums in New Jersey
Awards established in 1987
1987 establishments in New Jersey